The 1987 Nordic Indoor Athletics Championships was the second and final edition of the international indoor athletics competition between Nordic countries and was held in Oslo, Norway. It consisted of 22 individual track and field events, 12 for men and 10 for women.

Finland won the most golds for a second year, at nine. Sweden won the most medals overall at 23. The hosts Norway had the second highest medal haul at 21, while Denmark managed only two medals. Two women won medals in two events: Ringa Ropo of Finland won minor medals in the women's jumps and 800 metres champion Maiken Sørum also won a 1500 metres bronze.

Medal summary

Men

Women

Medal table

References
Nordic Indoor Championships. GBR Athletics. Retrieved 2018-05-20.

1987
Nordic Championships
Nordic Championships
1980s in Oslo
International sports competitions in Oslo
International athletics competitions hosted by Norway